Womadelaide '95 is a compilation album of music by artists from Womadelaide in 1995. The songs were recorded live by ABC Radio sound crews. Bruce Elder from the Sydney Morning Herald wrote that the album was "an extraordinary demonstration of how some of the greatest world music acts are reduced by studio technology, and how immensely better they sound when they perform live." The album was nominated the 1996 ARIA Award for Best World Music Album.

Track listing

 Didgeridoo Solo/Baru (Crocodile) - Sunrize Band
 Les Mamas Des Mamas - Zap Mama
 We've Started A Fire - Vika and Linda Bull
 Uzelange - Hukwe Zawose
 Modernise, Westernise - Rough Image
 Static - Mouth Music
 Sahara (Medley) - Jah Wobble's Invaders of the Heart
 Boabab - Justin Vali Trio
 Cachito Pa Huele - Sierra Maestra
 Lapwony - Geoffrey Oryema
 Loay Loay Aaja Mahi - Nusrat Fateh Ali Khan
 Must Must - Nusrat Fateh Ali Khan
 Ari Lo - Yungchen Lhamo

References

World music compilation albums
Music festival compilation albums